Joseph Francis McGrath (March 1, 1871 – April 12, 1950) was an Irish-born American prelate of the Catholic Church. He served as Bishop of Baker City from 1919 until his death in 1950.

Biography

Early life and education
Joseph McGrath was born on March 1, 1871, in Kilmacow, County Kilkenny, to James and Margaret (née O'Farrell) McGrath. He was confirmed by Francis Moran, then Bishop of Ossory and later the cardinal archbishop of Sydney. After completing his classical education, he studied philosophy at St Kieran's College, Kilkenny.

McGrath was sponsored to study for the priesthood for the Diocese of Springfield in Massachusetts by Bishop Patrick Thomas O'Reilly, who sent McGrath to complete his theological studies at the Grand Séminaire in Montreal.

Priesthood
While in Montreal, McGrath was ordained a priest on December 21, 1895, by Archbishop Édouard-Charles Fabre. Following his ordination, he served as assistant pastor at St. Thomas Church in Adams. However, by 1900, the Diocese of Springfield had more priests than parishes, with 224 priests but only 111 parishes. McGrath was loaned to the Diocese of Portland, Maine, where he was made an assistant at St. Joseph Church in Old Town and did missionary work among Native Americans on the Penobscot Indian Island Reservation.

Facing poor health, McGrath sought a warmer climate and spent a few months in San Antonio, Texas. A visit to the Pacific Northwest brought him into contact with Bishop Edward John O'Dea, who needed more English-speaking priests in the Diocese of Seattle and appointed McGrath as an assistant at St. James Cathedral in 1904.

After two years at the cathedral, McGrath became pastor of St. Patrick Church, Tacoma, in January 1906. A fire had destroyed the church the year before McGrath's appointment, and he immediately began construction on a new church. The cornerstone was laid in March 1906 and the building was dedicated in June 1907. In addition to his pastoral duties, McGrath was named a diocesan consultor in 1910 and dean of the counties of Pierce, Thurston, and Grays Harbor in 1915.

Bishop of Baker City
In July 1918, Rev. Terrence G. Brady, the vicar general of the Archdiocese of Dubuque and rector of St. Raphael Cathedral, was named the next Bishop of Baker City, Oregon, to succeed Bishop Charles Joseph O'Reilly. However, Brady declined the appointment and Pope Benedict XV instead named McGrath as bishop on December 21, 1918, the twenty-third anniversary of his priestly ordination.

McGrath received his episcopal consecration on March 25, 1919, from Bishop O'Dea, with Bishops Mathias Clement Lenihan and John Patrick Carroll serving as co-consecrators, at St. James Cathedral in Seattle. He took formal charge of the Diocese of Baker City on April 1, 1919, when he was installed at St. Francis de Sales Cathedral.

During McGrath's 31-year tenure in Baker City, the Catholic population increased from 6,755 to 14,729 and the number of priests increased from 26 to 39; however, the total number of churches (including parishes and missions) fell from 54 to 50. With only one parochial school in the entire diocese at the beginning of his tenure, McGrath mandated that the Confraternity of Christian Doctrine be established in every parish and mission.

In 1948, the 77-year-old McGrath received Leo Fabian Fahey as a coadjutor bishop to assist and eventually succeed him. However, before he could replace McGrath, Fahey fell ill and died on March 31, 1950. Less than two weeks later, McGrath himself died on April 12, 1950.

References

1871 births
1950 deaths
People from County Kilkenny
Irish emigrants to the United States (before 1923)
Roman Catholic bishops of Baker
20th-century Roman Catholic bishops in the United States